Pamilya Ko is a 2019 Philippine drama television series broadcast by ABS-CBN. Directed by Raymund B. Ocampo, it stars Sylvia Sanchez, JM de Guzman, Arci Muñoz and Joey Marquez. The series aired on the network's Primetime Bida evening block and worldwide via The Filipino Channel from September 9, 2019 to March 13, 2020, replacing Minute to Win It: Last Tandem Standing.

History
Pamilya Ko was aired on ABS-CBN's Primetime Bida evening block every weeknights at 5:45 P.M. from September 9, 2019 to March 13, 2020 for a total of 135 episodes. Due to the enhanced community quarantine in Luzon caused by the COVID-19 pandemic in the Philippines, the drama was put on halt and was replaced by reruns of 100 Days to Heaven beginning March 16, 2020 (later moved to afternoon lineup) and Meteor Garden (2018) from May 4 until ceasing its free-to-air broadcast operations on May 5, 2020.

COVID-19 pandemic
On March 31, 2020, Sylvia Sanchez and her husband Art Atayde tested positive for COVID-19.

Cancellation
On June 13, 2020, it was announced that Pamilya Ko was among the series cancelled, along with Make It with You. This happened a month after ABS-CBN ceased its free-to-air broadcast operations on May 5, 2020, due to the cease and desist order issued by the National Telecommunications Commission (NTC) and Solicitor General Jose Calida. Meanwhile, Pamilya Ko production manager Mavic Holgado-Oducayen passed away on July 22, 2020 due to heart attack after the House of Representatives denied the new franchise for ABS-CBN.

Cast
Main cast
 JM de Guzman as Francisco "Chico Carbonel." Mabunga
 Arci Muñoz as Elizabeth "Betty" Palisoc
 Joey Marquez as Fernando "Fernan" Mabunga
 Sylvia Sanchez as Luzviminda "Luz" Ramirez-Mabunga
 Rosanna Roces as Elena Carbonell-Lombardi
 Irma Adlawan as Loida Magtulis (Supporting: Season 1, Main: Season 2)
Supporting cast
 Alyssa Muhlach as Dr. Sophia "Pia" dela Paz
 Kiko Estrada as Bernardo "Beri Ramirez." Mabunga
 Maris Racal as Peachy Ann Ramirez Mabunga
 Jairus Aquino as Percival "Persi" Ramirez Mabunga
 Mutya Orquia as Cherry Luz Ramirez Mabunga
 Raikko Mateo as John Paul "Pongky Ramirez" Mabunga
 Kira Balinger as Lemon Jane Ramirez Mabunga
 Kid Yambao as Apollo "Apol" Mabunga
 Perla Bautista as Caridad "Caring" Potenciano-Mabunga
 Kit Thompson as James Carvajal / Ferdie Quisumbing
 Joe Vargas as Boljak
 VJ Mendoza as Daks
 Peter Serrano as Richie Mabanta
 Marco Gallo as Stefano Carbonel Lombardi

Guest cast
 Noel Trinidad as Joselito "Jose" Mabunga
 CX Navarro as young Chico
 Andrez del Rosario as Jackie "Jack" Mabunga
 Miko Raval as Charles Ruiz
 Dominic Roque as David Lardizabal
 Boom Labrusca as Dr. Sofronio dela Paz
 Anne Feo as Regina Jurado-dela Paz
 Micah Muñoz as Atty. Raul Malvar
 Jeffrey Santos as Insp. Jose Rivas
 Shoichi Oka as Ryu Mori
 Glenda Garcia as Maria Asuncion "Azon" Ramirez-Cummings
 Frances Makil-Ignacio as Marny
 Bobby Andrews as young Carlos Quisumbing
 Maricel Morales as Corazon Quisumbing
 Miguel Faustmann as Carlos Quisumbing
 Heaven Peralejo as Maria Corrine Patricia "Macopa" de Jesus
 Marnie Lapus as Mrs. Dagdag
 JC de Vera as Prof. Nathaniel "Nathan" Rubiñol
 Sunshine Garcia as Merceditas "Mercy" Alvarez
 DJ Durano as Antonio "Tonio" Alvarez
 Nathalie Hart as Christina "Tina" Rubiñol
 Hero Angeles

Ratings

Awards and nominations

See also
List of programs broadcast by ABS-CBN
List of ABS-CBN drama series

References

External links
 

ABS-CBN drama series
2019 Philippine television series debuts
2020 Philippine television series endings
Filipino-language television shows
Television shows set in the Philippines
Television productions cancelled due to the COVID-19 pandemic